Henry "Baddie" Lebanon (10 October 1910 – c. 1986) was a South African boxer who competed in the 1928 Summer Olympics. He was born in Johannesburg. Sometimes his nickname is also spelt "Buddy". In 1928 he finished fourth of the flyweight class after losing the bronze medal bout to Carlo Cavagnoli.

External links
Baddie Lebanon's profile at Sports Reference.com
Biography of Baddie Lebanon

1910 births
1980s deaths
Flyweight boxers
Olympic boxers of South Africa
Boxers at the 1928 Summer Olympics
Boxers from Johannesburg
South African male boxers